Look Poochai Mai Ta Pode (English title: The Mighty Canes)  is Thai TV series or lakorn aired on Thailand's Channel 7 from March 9 to April 27, 2012 on Fridays, Saturdays and Sundays at 20:30 for 22 episodes.

The sequel is Ta Pode Logun which was broadcast in 2015.

Summary
At a community of bus terminus, when villagers were threatened by thieves. There will always be black masked superhero appear to help, everybody called him "Look Poochai" (ลูกผู้ชาย; "manly"). Look Poochai has two magic Ta Pode (ตะพด; type of Thai cane), one is Soul Ta Pode, and another is Blood Ta Pode.  They are what the godfather wants to be.

Cast

References

2012 Thai television series debuts
2012 Thai television series endings
Thai action television series
Fantasy television series
Superhero television shows
Channel 7 (Thailand) original programming